Gor Hakobyan (born January 14, 1988), is a musical artist, Armenian singer, rapper, actor and TV Host. His first video clip was released in 2014 (Տոնածառ ջան տոնածառ, My Christmas Tree Christmas Tree). He is known for his role as Feliks "Felo" on Full House (Armenian TV series). He was a guest of White corner on November 5, and a guest for Name that Tune on 2015 December 9. He was also a broadcaster of AntiVirus (show).

Biography
Gor Hakobyan was born on January 14, 1988, in the city of Kapan, at the age of 3, in 1991 he moved to Gyumri with his family. In 2004 he graduated from 37 secondary school in Gyumri. 
In 2010 he graduated from the acting department of Vanadzor branch of Yerevan State Institute of Theatre and Cinematography.In 2018 he founded Gor Hakobyan Music production recording studio. He is married and has three sons.

Filmography

Discography

Album
"Inadu"(2021)

Singles and songs
 2013 Mar – Петрос Петросян
 2013 Sep – "LoQsh" (featuring with Armen)
 2013 Feb – "Hip hop" (featuring with Sencho R.L.)
 2014 Dec – "Tonatzar jan, Tonatzar" (My Christmas Tree Christmas Tree) 
 2014 Apr – "Verjers" (Lately, featuring with HAMO B.I.G.)
 2014 Dec – "New Year" (featuring with Full House band` Arpi Gabrielyan, Mihran Tsarukyan, Ani Yeranyan, Grigor Danielyan)
 2014 Jun – "Selfi" (Selfie)
 2015 Dec – "New Year" (featuring with Full House band` Mihran Tsarukyan, Grigor Danielyan, Mardjan Avetisyan, Ani Yeranyan, Arpi Gabrielyan)
 2016 Aug – "Na e" (She is)
 2016 Dec – "Im axchik" (My girl)
 2017 Apr – "Sirtn im" (My heart)
 2018 Apr – "Ush lini, nush lini"
 2018 Jul – "Amara" (It's summer)(featuring with Christina Yeghoyan)
 2018 Dec - "Milionic1nes"
 2019 Jul – "Chemuchum"
 2019 Sep - "Gisher e" (featuring with Ayser Davtyan)
 2020 Apr – "Kneres" (Sorry)
 2020 Aug - "Inadu"   (featuring with Gevorg Martirosyan)
 2020 Aug - "Imanam"  (featuring with Narek Mets Hayq)
 2021 Feb - "Zatsepila" 
2021  Mar - "Hamoya" (featuring with Artyom Karapetyan)

External links

See also
 Guess the tune-Nick Yeghibyan, Narine Dovlatyan, Gor Hakobyan -First Channel of Armenia
 Gor Hakobyan feat. Artyom Karapetyan - "Hamoya"  Sounds European

References

1988 births
Living people
People from Gyumri
People from Kapan
21st-century Armenian male singers
Armenian pop singers
21st-century Armenian male actors
Musicians from Yerevan